Cogne lace is a handmade bobbin lace that is made in Cogne, in the Aosta Valley in Italy. It takes the form of strips of lace, due to the manner in which it is made on a drum.

History 
The tradition of Cogne lace began with the flight of the Benedictine sisters from the convent at Cluny to the Aosta Valley in 1665. They found refuge at Saint-Nicholas and first taught bobbin lacemaking in the area, though the diffusion of their teaching was not wide. Notebooks chronicling life in Cogne, written by inhabitants some decades after the events described, document the arrival of lacemaking in the mid 1800s.  However, local lacemakers had different recollections. Physical evidence in the form of similar lace-making horses indicate that the lace was introduced from great lace centers in France and Flanders via the neighboring Alpine regions. It was used by the women of Cogne to decorate their traditional black and white dress, with a black lace head kerchief and a white lace collar.

Equipment 

Cogne lace is handmade on a base or horse called a "cavalot," made of wood decoratively carved with rosettes or flower symbols. It may include the monogram of Christ, the year it was made, and the name of its first owner.  The base supports the "coessein," a wide cylinder stuffed with straw or wool.  Generally a male relative or fiancé made the pillow horse, which have a drawer to hold thread, pins, and bobbins.

The bobbins are made of hard wood, such as apple, pear, cherry, walnut and ash, trees all found in the Alps. The lower potions, of the bobbins used as handles, are round.

Lace Designs 
Cogne lace is characterized by being made without any pattern, rather it is made in an entirely mnemonic way, and uses the design on the fabric, usually checks but sometimes stripes, covering the "coessein." It is categorized as freehand lace. It produces bands that are only a few centimeters wide, up to a maximum of 7-8 cm (approximately 3 inches). The patterned fabric allows the lacemaker to keep her selvages straight, using large pins.

Today 
.The Mèison di pitz (Lace House, in Cognein dialect) is the permanent museum housing Cogne lace.

See also 
 Bobbin lace
 Freehand lace
 Cogne

References

External links 
  Les dentelles de Cogne - Coopérative « Les Dentellières » - Site officiel de l'Assessorat du tourisme - Région autonome Vallée d'Aoste
  Coopérative des dentellières de Cogne
  Maison de pitz - Les dentelles de Cogne
  Les dentelles de Cogne (ialpes.com)

Bibliography 
 Attilio Boccazzi Varotto, Dentelles de Cogne, éd. Priuli & Verlucca, 1996.
Cogne
Bobbin lace